Guy Barnett may refer to:

Guy Barnett (Australian politician) (born 1962), Liberal Party member of the Australian Senate
Guy Barnett (British politician) (1928–1986), Labour Party Member of Parliament